Complete Discocrappy is a double-disc discography album by Charles Bronson. The album consists of two discs featuring the band's entire recorded repertoire, and was released by 625 Thrashcore and Youth Attack! Records. The first disc contains previously released material (in chronological order), while disc two contains previously unreleased material. The album was pressed twice: the first pressing consisted of 2500 copies, the second consisted of 3000. The album was delayed at the pressing plant for about 4 months before discs were manufactured.

Several songs are featured more than once due to having been recorded and released more than once. A few cover tracks are also on this album.

Track listing

Disc 1

Disc 2

Personnel
Mark McCoy – Vocals
James De Jesus – Guitar (Disc 1, Tracks 1–10; Disc 2, Track 1)
Mike Sutfin – Guitar (Disc 1, Tracks 11–17; Disc 2, Tracks 2–21)
Aaron Aspinwall – Guitar (Disc 1, Tracks 26–56; Disc 2, Tracks 2–15)
Jeff Jelen – Guitar (Disc 1, Tracks 72–96; Disc 2, Tracks 16–19)
Jon Arends – Bass
Ebro Virumbrales – Drums (Disc 1; Disc 2, Tracks 1–19)
Max Ward – Drums (Disc 2, Tracks 20 and 21)

References

Sources
Album review site, including release year, track listing, record label and personnel information

Charles Bronson (band) albums
1999 albums